Luigi Perversi (22 May 1906 – 27 February 1991) was an Italian professional footballer who played as a full-back. He made 341 appearances for A.C. Milan, during the late 1920s and 1930s.

External links 
Profile at MagliaRossonera.it 

1906 births
1991 deaths
Sportspeople from the Province of Pavia
Italian footballers
Association football fullbacks
Serie A players
A.C. Milan players
Modena F.C. 2018 players
Footballers from Lombardy